Delphia is an unincorporated community located in Perry County, Kentucky, United States. It still maintains a U.S. Post Office with the zip code 41735.

References

Unincorporated communities in Perry County, Kentucky
Unincorporated communities in Kentucky